Lenore Fenton MacClain (née Lenore Fenton) was a championship typist and typewriting educator. She won numerous international typewriting awards and international records in typing.

Biography
MacClain is from Snokomish, Washington. She has undergraduate and master's degrees from the University of Washington.

Typing contests 
In 1937 she won a novice typing award with a speed of 87 words per minute. She won again in 1938, and in 1939 she broke her own transcription record and earned the title of "the world's greatest secretary". Earlier, she won the world championship on a Dvorak keyboard in Tenth Annual International Commercial Schools Contest in Chicago, June 19, 1946, by typing 131 net words per minute. In 1956 Popular Science noted that she had won so many typing contests that she cancelled additional contests. MacClain was listed in the 1971 edition of the Guinness Book of World Records for being the fastest typist in a one-hour timed test.

She became one of the students of August Dvorak and upon switching from a QWERTY layout to the Dvorak keyboard layout, MacClain increased her typing rate from 70 words per minute to 182 words per minute. MacClain's increased typing speed is given as an example in the discussions regarding the benefits of the Dvorak keyboard over the QWERTY layout. While it was first reported that she could type 180 words per minute, this number later edited to be 108 words per minute.

Teaching typing 
In 1944, she starred in United States Navy typewriting training videos, where she demonstrated proper touch typing technique, useful typewriter tips and tricks (such as rapid envelope addressing).

In the 1950s, along with J. Frank Dame, she co-authored a book Typewriting Techniques and Short Cuts, which saw a few editions and was reviewed by the Journal of Business Education. MacClain and her techniques are used as examples on how to type, and from 1951 until 1958 she was a typing instructor at Bolling Air Force Base. She taught people as young as fifth grade typing using either the QWERY layout of the Dvorak keyboard.

Later life 
She was the president of the Virginia chapter of the P.E.O. Sisterhood educational organization, and in that position led the state-wide convention in 1965.

She died on March 9, 2005 and was buried at the Arlington National Cemetery. Her Electromatic typewriter with a Dvorak Simplified Keyboard layout is in the collection of the National Museum of American History.

Select publications

References

External links

1912 births
2005 deaths
Burials at Arlington National Cemetery
People from Williamsburg, Virginia
Typing
Women educational theorists
American educational theorists
20th-century educational theorists
American textbook writers
Women textbook writers